A Wicked Ghost is a 1999 Hong Kong horror film directed by Leung Hung-wah, starring Francis Ng, Gigi Lai, Gabriel Harrison, Edward Mok, Nelson Ngai and Celia Sze. It was followed by A Wicked Ghost II: The Fear in 2000 and A Wicked Ghost III: The Possession in 2002.

Plot
Annie and three friends play a game of "contacting ghosts". While they are playing, Annie's boyfriend Ming sees a ghost and immediately stops them. After the three friends die under mysterious circumstances, Ming's sister Cissy is worried that something will happen to Ming so she seeks help from her friend Fa-mo. In the meantime, Annie is possessed by a ghost, who tells Ming that Annie has three days to live.

After doing some research, Ming and Fa-mo travel to an abandoned village and find Lee Keung, an old man who grew up there. He tells them about Cho Yan-may, a Cantonese opera singer who was framed for adultery and killed by the villagers. In the three days after her death, Cho's vengeful ghost caused 66 villagers to die in unnatural ways.

While drinking from a freshwater pool near the village, they see Cho's ghost in the water and believe that Cho's remains have ended up in the pool. Fa-mo and Ming figure out that Cho's ghost can "pollute" the water in the freshwater pool with her vengeful aura and cause people who drink from it to experience hallucinations and kill themselves. They manage to stop Cissy's fiancé Jack, who is in a trance, from forcing Cissy to drink the water.

When Ming dives into the pool to find Cho's remains, he passes through a supernatural portal and finds her body, but she strangles him to death. Upon realising that Ming is dead, Fa-mo rushes back to Jack's home and drinks the "polluted" water so that he can see Cho's ghost and confront her. When he hugs Cissy, whom he has a crush on, she transforms into Cho. He realises that it is an illusion, so he embraces her tightly. Thinking that they truly love each other, Cho's ghost spares them and disappears. When Jack regains consciousness, he is unhappy to see Fa-mo embracing his fiancée. Cho's ghost suddenly appears beside him and he screams.

Cast
 Francis Ng as Fa-mo
 Gigi Lai as Cissy
 Gabriel Harrison as Ming
 Edward Mok as Jack
 Chow Yan-yan as Cho Yan-may
 Nelson Ngai as Cho's husband
 Celia Sze as Annie
 Lui Tat as Lee Keung
 Cheung Yue-lee as Lee Keung (boy)
 Lam Suk-yan as Biggie
 Joseph Tang as Rubbish
 Man Yeung as Big-B

External links
 
 

1999 films
Hong Kong supernatural horror films
1990s Cantonese-language films
1999 horror films
1990s Hong Kong films